Marymount School Barranquilla (also referred to simply as "Marymount") is a private, co-educational, Catholic school catering to students from Early Childhood to Grade 12 (aged 3–19) located in Barranquilla, Colombia. It operates on the American school system, participating and being an exam center for the region on SAT and PSAT/NMSQT exams.

History and overview 
Founded in 1953 by the Religious of the Sacred Heart of Mary, Marymount is located in a residential section of the city of Barranquilla. Originally a school for girls, Marymount opened a section for boys in 1981. Boys now form approximately one third to one half of each academic group throughout the school.

Marymount has an average enrollment of 1300 students served by a faculty and staff numbering over 180. The main campus houses the administration and library building, the primary school, the elementary school, junior and senior high school, limited sports facilities, and a modern chapel and auditorium building. The Preschool facilities (Nursery, Pre-Kinder, Kinder and Transition), and a free tuition school ("Fundación Educativa Madre Buttler or Fundemabu") are located across the street. Marymount has extended sports facilities on a 4-hectare piece of land approximately 20 minutes from the main campus, called the "Promised Land"; this is where the whole school will move at a future date.

Colegio Marymount is a Colombian school, subject to the directives and frequent supervision of the Colombian Ministry of Education at each level. Since 99% of the students speak Spanish at home, the preschool has adopted a total English immersion program for the first years of school. Approximately 99% of the primary and elementary school curriculum is taught in English using textbooks printed in the States. Each grade level has three to four class divisions with 19 to 27 students per group.

Through extra class hours and intensified college preparation programs, completely bilingual graduates receive the Colombian Bachillerato Diploma, the Marymount High School diploma, the Marymount Principles of Office Management Diploma, the University of Michigan English Proficiency Certificate, and the French Alliance Certificate. Students in the upper grades take standardized tests including the PSAT, SAT, TOEFL, ELPT, and ICFES (Colombia's version of the SAT). 100% Marymount's graduates enter colleges and universities in Colombia, USA, and Europe.

It has been ranked for many years as Barranquilla's top private school. It has for many consecutive years gained the highest results in SAT, TOEFL, and ICFES exams in the City of Barranquilla and the Caribbean Region of Colombia

Their mission is to provide comprehensive and Catholic education for the training of leaders committed to a global society through teaching and learning to love God, others, and the world around us.

Harvard University influence 

Marymount’s teaching methodologies are coherent with the pedagogical approach of the “Teaching for Understanding” Project Zero of the Harvard Graduate School of Education. Project Zero’s mission is to understand and improve learning, thinking, and creativity in both the humanistic and the scientific disciplines, at an individual and institutional level. This pedagogical approach defines “understanding” as “the ability to apply knowledge in new situations”. It consists of teaching by processes that seek to develop critical, creative, and meta-cognitive thinking, and the ability to solve problems. Its prime goal is to have individuals understand the thinking processes so well that they can apply them in different disciplines and/or situations of their professional and personal life.

Accreditations and affiliations

New England Association of Schools and Colleges
The New England Association of Schools and Colleges (NEASC), founded in 1885, is the oldest regional accrediting association in the United States whose stated mission is the establishment and maintenance of high standards for all levels of education, from pre-kindergarten to the doctoral level.

NEASC serves more than 2000 public and independent schools, colleges and universities in the six states of Connecticut, Maine, Massachusetts, New Hampshire, Rhode Island and Vermont and 138 American/International schools around the globe.

The NEASC is headquartered in Bedford, Massachusetts.

Marymount Colleges 
The Marymount Colleges are a group of colleges founded by the Religious of the Sacred Heart of Mary (RSHM), an institute with French origins which was founded on February 24, 1849. When the institution expanded to the United States, its members founded a series of parochial schools, called the RSHM Network of Schools, with the name "Marymount."

Council of International Schools 
The Council of International Schools (CIS) is a non-profit association of international schools and post-secondary institutions which aims to improve international education. It provides services such as: educational accreditation, teacher and leadership recruitment services, links to higher education, governance assistance and help with founding new schools.

CIS works with its member schools around the world, most of which are co-educational and independent, catering for students between the ages of 3 to 19 years.  These schools serve the expatriate community, although many also have a substantial enrolment of local nationals.  They vary in size from an enrolment of 50 to over 2,000.  In the majority of schools the language of instruction is English, although not all students are native English speakers.  About a quarter of the member schools offer part of their curriculum in a second language.  Some schools offer a standard U.S. college preparatory program of studies, others a traditional British curriculum, while others combine elements from these and other systems.  An increasing number offers an international curriculum culminating in the International Baccalaureate Diploma.

Notable alumni
 Cecilia Álvarez-Correa Glen, Minister of Commerce, Industry and Tourism
 Yaneth Giha Tovar, Minister of Education
 Elsa Noguera, Politician and Economist
 Adriana Tarud, Miss Colombia 2004
 Sofia Vergara, Model and Actress 
 Natalia Abello Vives, Minister of Transport of Colombia
 Barbie, astronaut, ballet dancer, paleontologist, tennis player, yoga instructor, marine biologist, dancer, figure skater, etc...

External links 

 Marymount Barranquilla
 Barranquilla Model United Nations

Educational institutions established in 1953
Schools in Colombia
International schools in Colombia
1953 establishments in Colombia